
Gorzów County is a unit of territorial administration and local government (powiat) in Lubusz Voivodeship, western Poland. It came into being on January 1, 1999, as a result of the Polish local government reforms passed in 1998. Its administrative seat is the city of Gorzów Wielkopolski, although the city is not part of the county (it constitutes a separate city county).

As of 2019 its total population is 71,669, out of which the population of Kostrzyn nad Odrą is 17,778, that of Witnica is 6,747, and the rural population is 47,144.

Neighbouring counties
Apart from the city of Gorzów Wielkopolski, Gorzów County is also bordered by Strzelce-Drezdenko County to the north-east, Międzyrzecz County to the south-east, Sulęcin County to the south, Słubice County to the south-west and Myślibórz County to the north-west. It also borders Brandenburg in Germany.

Administrative division
The county is subdivided into seven gminas (one urban, one urban-rural and five rural). These are listed in the following table, in descending order of population.

References

 
Land counties of Lubusz Voivodeship